is a snowboarder from Chiba, Japan, specializing in halfpipe riding. She works in finance and lives in Tokyo, Japan. She was a member of the Japanese National team at the 2002 Salt Lake City Winter Olympics. Nagako competed 10 years in competitive snowboarding around the world and now enjoys casual snowboarding in Japan. She is studying to obtain an accounting license in Japan and also helping with snowboarding tours from Tokyo in the winter.

Competitive history highlights
4th  Nationals at Takaifuji, 2007
26th FIS National Championships in Tsubetu, 2006
2nd FIS National Championships in Ajigasawa, 2002
22nd Winter Olympic Games in Park City, 2002
4th FIS World Cup in Berchtesgaden, Germany,2001
3rd FIS World Cup in Whistler, Canada, 2000
4th FIS World Cup in Sapporo, Japan, 2000

References

Profile. International Ski Federation. Accessed 2 October 2011.

External links
 
 

1975 births
Living people
People from Chiba (city)
Japanese female snowboarders
Olympic snowboarders of Japan
Snowboarders at the 2002 Winter Olympics